Stillingia linearifolia is a species of flowering plant in the euphorb family known as queen's-root.

It is native to the Southwestern United States, Southern California, and Northwestern Mexico, where it occurs in several types of dry and disturbed habitat in deserts, mountains, foothills, and chaparral.

Description
Stillingia linearifolia is a perennial herb producing a clump of slender, branching, erect stems approaching 70 centimeters in height. The alternately arranged leaves are linear and narrow, reaching 4 centimeters in length but less than 2 millimeters in width.

The inflorescence is an erect spike of flowers a few centimeters long. The plant is monoecious, and each spike has several male flowers at the tip and a few fruit-bearing female flowers below these. Neither type of flower has petals. The ovary of the female flower develops into a three-lobed greenish capsule 3 to 4 millimeters wide.

There is a tiny black seed in each of the three chambers of the fruit.

See also

References

External links
Jepson Manual Treatment of Stillingia linearifolia
Stillingia linearifolia — UC Photos gallery

linearifolia
Taxa named by Sereno Watson
Plants described in 1879
Flora of California
Flora of Baja California
Flora of Arizona
Flora of Nevada
Flora of New Mexico
Flora of Sonora
Flora of the Sonoran Deserts
Flora of the California desert regions
Natural history of the California chaparral and woodlands
Natural history of the Colorado Desert
Natural history of the Mojave Desert
Natural history of the Peninsular Ranges
Natural history of the Santa Monica Mountains
Natural history of the Transverse Ranges
Flora without expected TNC conservation status